Axtla de Terrazas is one of the 58 municipalities in San Luis Potosí in central Mexico. The municipality was founded 1826, its name comes from Nahuatl (astlan) and is interpreted as: "Place of white herons", it was added de Terrazas in honor of the revolutionary Alfredo M. Terrazas.

Politics 
Gregorio Cruz Martinez is the Constitutional Municipality President as of 2021 with his term lasting until 2024

Demographics 
According to the II Population and Housing Count of 2005, the municipality has 32,721 inhabitants, of which 16,298 are men and 16,423 are women. 75% of the population is indigenous or at least of indigenous descent,65% of the population is catholic

Castle of Health 
The Castle Of Health (Spanish: Castillo De La Salud) is an medicinal castle built in 1974 by Beto Ramon, a Huasteca Indian man who learned traditional/herbal medicine, the castle has symbolic meaning, with parts of the castle referencing passages from the bible. The castle is still in use by people who use traditional and herbal medicine.

References

Municipalities of San Luis Potosí